Hackensack RiverWalk, also known as the Hackensack River Greenway, a is partially constructed greenway along the Newark Bay and Hackensack River in Hudson County, New Jersey, United States. The  linear park, which closely follows the contour of the water's edge where possible, runs along the west side of Bergen Neck peninsula between its southern tip at Bergen Point, where it would connect to the Hudson River Waterfront Walkway, and the Eastern Brackish Marsh in the north. The walkway passes through the contiguous municipalities of Bayonne (5.5 linear miles), Jersey City (5.6 linear miles), and Secaucus with a potential connection to a walkway in North Bergen. It passes through new and established residential neighborhoods, county and municipal parks, brownfields, industrial areas, commercial districts, and wetland preserves. While existing parks and promenades have been incorporated and new sections have been built there remain gaps. It will pass under sixteen bridges (some no longer in use) and cross over eight natural creeks. Since 1988, in accordance with the public trust doctrine New Jersey law requires new construction built within  of the water must provide  of public space along the water's edge. In September 2022, the Lower Hackensack was declared a federal superfund site, triggering a process to remediate and restore the water and shoreline.

Route and points along walkway

 Collins Park along the Kill van Kull
 Bayonne Bridge
 Bergen Point
1888 Studios (proposed film studios)
Bayview (proposed)
Bayonne Luxury Waterwalk (proposed)
Site of CRRNJ Newark Bay Bridge caissons
Boatworks, former Electric Launch Company, promenade
Robins Reef Yacht Club (private)
16th Street Park
Don Ahern Veterans Memorial Stadium
 Bayonne High School
Stephen R. Gregg Park—Bayonne Park
 Rutowski Park
 Route 440 south bound right-of-way
 Newark Bay Bridge, part of New Jersey Turnpike Extension I-78
 Lehigh Valley Railroad Bridge
 New Jersey City University Athletic Complex
 Droyer's Point promenade
 Bayfront (planned)
 Jersey City Municipal Utilities Authority facility
 Site of New York and Newark Railroad Bridge caissons
 Hudson Toyota/Hudson Nissan car dealerships
 Hudson Mall
 Morris Canal Lock 21 East (remnants) — Morris Canal Greenway (proposed)
 Western Gateway (proposed)
 Lincoln Highway Hackensack River Bridge/U.S. Route 1/9 Truck, aka Communipaw Avenue
 Lincoln Park West
 Hudson County Former Prosecutor's and Sheriff's Offices (Duncan Avenue)
 Pulaski Skyway
 Skyway Park
 Vertical Lift Historic District
PATH Lift Bridge (PATH)
Harsimus Branch Lift (CSX Transportation)
Wittpenn Bridge (New Jersey Route 7)
 Lower Hack Lift (NJ Transit Rail Operations) 
 Site of Hudson Generating Station
 Former NY&GL/NJT Boonton Line right of way — Essex-Hudson Greenway (proposed)
 Penhorn Creek
 Riverbend Wetlands Preserve
 Portal Bridge (Northeast Corridor - Amtrak and NJ Transit)
 New Jersey Turnpike Eastern Spur
 DB Draw - bridge de-commissioned (2002)
 Laurel Hill County Park
 Waterside at Exchange
Meadowlands Parkway
 Upper Hack Lift, for NJ Transit's Main Line and Port Jervis Line
 Anderson Creek Marsh
 HX Draw for NJ Transit's Bergen County Line and Pascack Valley Line
 Harmon Cove
 Hudson Regional Hospital
 Mud Flats
 Harmon Plaza
 Snipes Park 
 Route 3 Bridge (twin-span)
 Riverside Court
 Trolley Park, Oak Lane Park, Acorn Park Farm Lane Park
 Secaucus High School Marsh
 Mill Creek Point Park - 0.5 mile walking trail
 Mill Creek Marsh - 1.5 mile walking trail
 Harmon Meadow Plaza
 Cromakill Creek
West Side Avenue/Eastern Brackish Marsh
Paunpeck Creek
Bellmans Creek

Gallery

See also
 List of crossings of the Hackensack River

References

External links
Hackensack River Inlet

Hackensack River
Protected areas of Hudson County, New Jersey
Hiking trails in New Jersey
Geography of Hudson County, New Jersey
New Jersey Meadowlands District
Parks in Hudson County, New Jersey
Redeveloped ports and waterfronts in the United States
Port of New York and New Jersey